The Marxist Party was a tiny Trotskyist political party in the United Kingdom.  It was formed as a split from Sheila Torrance's Workers' Revolutionary Party in 1987 by Gerry Healy and supporters including Vanessa and Corin Redgrave.  At first, it was also known as the Workers Revolutionary Party, but it renamed itself later in the year.  The party also maintained its own version of the International Committee of the Fourth International, although this was moribund by the late 1990s.

After the death of Healy in 1989, the party declined, and in 1990 expelled a group which became the Communist League.

The group, which called for support for the Liberal Democrats in the 2001 UK general election, published The Marxist magazine.  They also famously owned Trotsky's death mask.

In April 2004, the Marxist Party announced its dissolution.  The Redgraves then announced the formation of a new group named the Peace and Progress Party, supporting liberal principles of human rights.

References

External links
Archived Marxist Party website as of 2002

International Committee of the Fourth International
Marxist parties in the United Kingdom
Political parties established in 1987
Political parties disestablished in 2004
Defunct Trotskyist organisations in the United Kingdom
Workers Revolutionary Party (UK)
1987 establishments in the United Kingdom